Edward Sargent (1815–1889) was an Anglican priest, most notably an Assistant Bishop in the Diocese of Madras.

Sargent was born in Paris and educated at CMS College Kottayam. He was ordained in 1842
and served the Church of England in Tirunelveli, Suviseshapuram and Palamcottah. He received the degree of Doctor of Divinity (DD).

References

1815 births
Clergy from Paris
CMS College Kottayam alumni
19th-century Anglican bishops in Asia
Christian clergy from Chennai
1889 deaths
Holders of a Lambeth degree
Anglican bishops of Madras